Lykhivka is an urban-type settlement in Kamianske Raion of Dnipropetrovsk Oblast in Ukraine. It is located in the northwest of the oblast, on the banks of the Omelnyk, a right tributary of the Dnieper. Lykhivka hosts the administration of Lykhivka settlement hromada, one of the hromadas of Ukraine. Population: 

Until 18 July 2020, Lykhivka belonged to Piatykhatky Raion. The raion was abolished in July 2020 as part of the administrative reform of Ukraine, which reduced the number of raions of Dnipropetrovsk Oblast to seven. The area of Piatykhatky Raion was merged into Kamianske Raion.

Economy

Transportation
Lykhivka has access to Highway H08 which connects Kamianske and Kremenchuk, and Highway M04, connecting Dnipro with Znamianka with a further connection to Kropyvnytskyi.

References

Urban-type settlements in Kamianske Raion